Traditional  in Japan have a long tradition and history. Included in the category of traditional crafts are handicrafts produced by an individual or a group, as well as work produced by independent studio artists working with traditional craft materials and/or processes.

History 
Japanese craft dates back since humans settled on its islands. Handicrafting has its roots in the rural crafts – the material-goods necessities – of ancient times. Handicrafters used naturally- and indigenously-occurring materials. Traditionally, objects were created to be used and not just to be displayed and thus, the border between craft and art was not always very clear. Crafts were needed by all strata of society and became increasingly sophisticated in their design and execution. Craftsmen and women therefore became artisans with increasing sophistication. However, wares were not just produced for domestic consumption, but at some point items such as ceramics made by studio craft were produced for export and became an important pillar of the economy.

Family affiliations or bloodlines are of special importance to the aristocracy and the transmission of religious beliefs in various Buddhist schools. In Buddhism, the use of the term "bloodlines" likely relates to a liquid metaphor used in the sutras: the decantation of teachings from one "dharma vessel" to another, describing the full and correct transference of doctrine from master to disciple. Similarly, in the art world, the process of passing down knowledge and experience formed the basis of familial lineages. For ceramic, metal, lacquer, and bamboo craftsmen, this acquisition of knowledge usually involved a lengthy apprenticeship with the master of the workshop, often the father of the young disciple, from one generation to the next. It encompassed strict rules that had to be observed in order to enable learning and teaching of a way. The wisdom could be taught either orally, or in writing. Living in the master's household and participating in household duties, apprentices carefully observed the master, senior students, and workshop before beginning any actual training. Even in the later stages of an apprenticeship it was common for a disciple to learn only through conscientious observation. Apprenticeship required hard work from the pupil almost every day in exchange for little or no pay. It was quite common that the mastery in certain crafts were passed down within the family from one generation to the next, establishing veritable dynasties. In that case the established master's name was assumed instead of the personal one. Should there be an absence of a male heir, a relative or a student could be adopted in order to continue the line and assume the prestigious name.

With the end of the Edo period and the advent of the modern Meiji era, industrial production was introduced; western objects and styles were copied and started replacing the old. On the fine art level, patrons such as feudal  lords were unable to support local artisans as much as they had done in the past. Although handmade Japanese craft was once the dominant source of objects used in daily life, modern era industrial production as well as importation from abroad sidelined it in the economy. Traditional craft began to wane, and disappeared in many areas, as tastes and production methods changed. Forms such as swordmaking became obsolete. Japanese scholar Okakura Kakuzō wrote against the fashionable primacy of western art and founded the periodical  to draw attention to the issue. Specific crafts that had been practiced for centuries were increasingly under threat, while others that were more recent developments introduced from the west, such as glassmaking, saw a rise.

Although these objects were designated as National Treasures – placing them under the protection of the imperial government – it took some time for their cultural value to be fully recognized. These artists were considered most famous and prestigious and worked in the areas such as painting, ceramics, and lacquerware. Although this system of patronage offered them some kind of protection, craftsmen and women on the folk art level were left exposed. One reaction to this development was the  – the folk art movement that developed in the late 1920s and 1930s, whose founding father was Yanagi Sōetsu (1889–1961). Yanagi Sōetsu discovered beauty in everyday ordinary and utilitarian objects created by nameless and unknown craftspersons.

The Second World War left the country devastated and as a result, craft suffered. The government introduced a new program known as Living National Treasure to recognise and protect craftspeople (individually and as groups) on the fine and folk art level. Inclusion in the list came with financial support for the training of new generations of artisans so that the art forms could continue. In 1950, the national government instituted the intangible cultural properties categorization, which is given to cultural property considered of high historical or artistic value in terms of the craft technique. The term refers exclusively to the human skill possessed by individuals or groups, which are indispensable in producing cultural property. It also took further steps: in 2009, for example, the government inscribed  into the UNESCO Intangible Cultural Heritage Lists. Prefectural governments, as well as those on the municipal level, also have their own system of recognising and protecting . Although the government has taken these steps, private sector artisans continue to face challenges trying to stay true to tradition whilst at the same time interpreting old forms and creating new ideas in order to survive and remain relevant to customers. They also face the dilemma of an ageing society wherein knowledge is not passed down to enough pupils of the younger generation, which means  teacher-pupil relationships within families break down if a successor is not found. As societal rules changed and became more relaxed, the traditional patriarchal system has been forced to undergo changes as well. In the past, males were predominantly the holders of "master" titles in the most prestigious crafts. Ceramist Tokuda Yasokichi IV was the first female to succeed her father as a master, since he did not have any sons and was unwilling to adopt a male heir. Despite modernisation and westernisation, a number of art forms still exist, partly due to their close connection to certain traditions: examples include the Japanese tea ceremony, and to a certain degree, martial arts (in the case of swordmaking).

The  takes place every year with the aim of reaching out to the public. In 2015, the Museum of Arts and Design in New York exhibited a number of modern  artists in an effort to introduce Japanese craft to an international audience.

Ceramics 

Japanese pottery and porcelain, one of the country's oldest art forms, dates back to the Neolithic period. Kilns have produced earthenware, pottery, stoneware, glazed pottery, glazed stoneware, porcelain, and blue-and-white ware. Japan has an exceptionally long and successful history of ceramic production. Earthenware was created as early as the Jōmon period (10,000–300 BCE), giving Japan one of the oldest ceramic traditions in the world. Japan is further distinguished by the unusual esteem that ceramics holds within its artistic tradition, owing to the enduring popularity of the tea ceremony.

Some of the recognised techniques of Japanese ceramic craft are:
 
  
 
 
 
 
 
 
 

There are many different types of Japanese ware. Those more identified as being close to the craft movement include: 

 , from Imbe in Bizen province
 , from Hagi, Yamaguchi prefecture 
 , from Hasami, Nagasaki prefecture 
 , porcelain developed by Sakaida Kakiemon in Arita, Saga prefecture
 , from Karatsu, Saga prefecture
 , from Kutani, Ishikawa prefecture 
 , from Mashiko, Tochigi prefecture 
 , from Sado, Niigata prefecture 
 , from Onta, Ōita prefecture 
 , from Seto, Aichi prefecture 
 , from Shigaraki, Shiga prefecture 
 , from Mino province
 , from Tokoname, Aichi prefecture 
 , from Ryūkyū Islands

Textiles 
Textile crafts include silk, hemp, linen and cotton woven, dyed and embroidered into various forms—from crafts originating from folk designs to complex silk weaves intended for the upper classes.

Village crafts that evolved from ancient folk traditions also continued in the form of weaving and indigo dyeing—by the Ainu people of Hokkaidō (whose distinctive designs have prehistoric prototypes) and by other remote farming families in northern Japan.

They are also used to sew , the sash worn with a kimono.

The different techniques for dyeing designs onto fabric are:

  
 
 
 
 
 
 

Some weaving techniques are:

 
 
 
 

Amongst the more well-known regional textiles are:
 , silk brocade using flosting yarns and gilt paper from the Nishijin district of Kyoto
 , a dyeing techniwue from Kaga, Ishikawa prefecture
 , a dyeing technique from Kyoto
 , a stencil-dye technique from the Ryukyuan Islands

Lacquerware 

The art of Japanese lacquerware can be traced to prehistoric artefacts. Japanese lacquerware is most often employed on wooden objects, which receive multiple layers of refined lac juices, each of which must dry before the next is applied. These layers make a tough skin impervious to water damage and resistant to breakage, providing lightweight, easy-to-clean utensils of every sort. The decoration on such lacquers, whether carved through different-colored layers or in surface designs, applied with gold or inlaid with precious substances, has been a prized art form since the Nara period (710–94 CE).

Japanese lacquerware is closely entwined with wood and bamboo work; the base material is usually wood, but  or  can also be used.

The different techniques used in the application and decoration of lacquer are:
 , which is the oldest and most basic decorative technique
 
 
 
 
 
 
 
 

Amongst the more well-known types of lacquerware are:
 , lacquerware from Wajima, Ishikawa prefecture
 , lacquerware from Tsugaru region around Hirosaki, Aomori prefecture

Wood and bamboo 

Wood and bamboo have always had a place in Japanese architecture and art due to the abundance of available materials, resulting in the long tradition of Japanese carpentry. Both secular and religious buildings were and are made out of wood, as well as items used in the household, typically dishes and boxes.

Japanese tea ceremony is closely entwined with the practices of bamboo crafts (for spoons) and woodwork and lacquerware (for ).

Types of woodwork include:
 
 
 
 

Japanese bamboowork implements are produced for tea ceremonies,  flower arrangement and interior goods. The types of bamboowork are:
 
 

The weaving process gives the  pattern a chiral wallpaper group symmetry of p6 (632).

Other materials such as reeds are also used in the broad category of Japanese woodwork.  is a traditional form of weaving basket for cats.

Amongst the more well-known varieties of miscellaneous woodwork are:
 , wooden marquetry from Hakone, Ashigarashimo district, and Odawara, Kanagawa prefecture
 , wooden chests of drawers, from Oshu, Iwate prefecture

Metalwork 
Early Japanese iron-working techniques date back to the 3rd to 2nd century BCE. Japanese swordsmithing is of extremely high quality and greatly valued; swordsmithing in Japan originated before the 1st century BCE, and reached the height of its popularity as the chief possession of warlords and samurai. Swordsmithing is considered a separate artform from iron- and metalworking, and has moved beyond the craft it once started out as.

Outside of swordsmithing, a number of items for daily use were historically made out of metal, resulting in the development of metalworking outside of the production of weaponry.

Traditional metal casting techniques include:

 
 
 

, the technique of shaping metal items through beating them with a hammer, is also used in traditional Japanese metalwork.

Forge welding is commonly used to make tools such as chisels and planes.

To create various patterns on the surface of a piece of metal, metal carving is used to apply decorative designs.

Amongst the more well-known types of Japanese metalware are:
 , ironware from Morioka and Oshu, Iwate prefecture
 , copperware from Takaoka, Toyama prefecture

Dolls 

There are various types of traditional , some representing children and babies, some representing the imperial court, warriors and heroes, fairy-tale characters, gods and (rarely) demons, and also everyday people. Some are manufactured as a local craft, to be purchased by pilgrims as a souvenir of a temple visit or some other trip.

There are four different basic types of doll, based on their base material:

 
 , made out of papier-mache
 , made out of ceramic

The painting or application techniques are:
 
 
 
 
 
 

Paper making 
The Japanese art of making paper from the mulberry plant called  is thought to have begun in the 6th century. Dyeing paper with a wide variety of hues and decorating it with designs became a major preoccupation of the Heian court, and the enjoyment of beautiful paper and its use has continued thereafter, with some modern adaptations. Some printmakers have their own logo made into their papers, and since the Meiji period, another special application has been Western marbleized end papers (made by the Atelier Miura in Tokyo).

Other crafts

Glass 

Only relatively late in the Edo period did it experience increased popularity, and with the beginning of modernisation during the Meiji era large-scale industrial production of glassware commenced.

The various techniques used are:

Cloisonné 

 is a glass-like glaze that is applied to a metal framework, and then fired in a kiln. It developed especially in Owari province around Nagoya in the late Edo period and going into the Meiji era. One of the leading traditional producing companies that still exists is the Ando Cloisonné Company.

Techniques of  include:

Gem carving 
 is carving naturally patterned agate or various hard crystals into tea bowls and incense containers.

Decorative gilt or silver leaf 
 is a decorative technique used for paintings and Buddhist statues, which applies gold leaf, silver leaf, platinum leaf cut into geometric patterns of lines, diamonds and triangles.

Inkstone carving 
Calligraphy is considered one of the classical refinements and art forms of Japan. The production of inkstones was therefore greatly valued.

Ivory carving 
 is the art of engraving and dyeing ivory.

See also 
 Intangible Cultural Properties of Japan for a full listing of protected crafts on the national, prefectural, and municipal levels

References

  – Japan

Further reading 
 Kogei Standard
 http://www.veniceclayartists.com/kogei-japanese-art-crafts/
 http://www.japantimes.co.jp/news/2010/11/05/national/kogei-get-western-art-worlds-attention/

External links 

 Japan Kogei Association
 Densan (The Association for the Promotion of Traditional Craft Industries)
 Japan Traditional Crafts Aoyama Square  by Densan
 Map of Traditional Crafts in Japan